Raymond Richard Waru  (born 1952) is a New Zealand Māori radio and television director and producer.

Early life
Waru spent his childhood in Auckland. He was educated at St Peter's College.

Career
Waru obtained positions in radio and television from the 1970s.  In 1980, he headed the original Television New Zealand Māori production unit.  Waru directed a broad range of Māori programmes, including the first ever full Māori language drama project, Te Ohaki a Nihe, and items on the Te Māori exhibition.

In the 1980s Waru produced and directed a revolutionary documentary series, The Natural World of the Māori, various film and television productions in New Zealand and in Australia, as well as an IMAX production under the East-West Center in Hawaii.  In the 1980s he was appointed as chief executive of the Aotearoa Māori Radio Trust, charged with the development of a national Māori radio system.

In the 1990s Waru was co-producer of the major history series, Our People, Our Century, a winner at the 2000 New Zealand Film and TV Awards, and he produced Toro Mai, a 25-part serial drama  in te reo.

In 2005 Waru co-produced the New Zealand historical series, Frontier of Dreams, The Story of New Zealand

In the 2006 Queen's Birthday Honours, Waru was appointed a Member of the New Zealand Order of Merit, for services to radio and television.

In 2012 Waru published "Secrets & Treasures" which consists of "stories told through the objects at Archives New Zealand" and which "delves into the archives to tell a very human story of New Zealand, a story that involves love, death, war, immigration, disaster, protest, defiance, censorship and hokey pokey".

References

1952 births
Living people
People from Auckland
People educated at St Peter's College, Auckland
New Zealand Māori people
New Zealand television directors
New Zealand television producers
New Zealand Māori broadcasters
Members of the New Zealand Order of Merit